541 may refer to:
541 AD, a year
Area code 541, a North American telephone area code in Oregon